A Thousand Suns is the fourth studio album by American rock band Linkin Park. It was released on September 13, 2010, by Warner Bros. Records. The album was produced by Mike Shinoda and Rick Rubin, who had also worked together to produce the band's previous studio album Minutes to Midnight (2007). Recording sessions for A Thousand Suns took place at NRG Recording Studios in North Hollywood, California from 2008 until early 2010.

A Thousand Suns is a concept album dealing with human fears such as nuclear warfare. The band has said the album is a drastic departure from their previous work; they experimented on different and new sounds. Shinoda told MTV the album references numerous social issues and blends human ideas with technology. The title is a reference to the Bhagavad Gita, a line in which was first popularized in 1945 by J. Robert Oppenheimer, who described the atomic bomb as being "as bright as a thousand suns". It also appears in a line from the first single of the album, "The Catalyst". A Thousand Suns is Linkin Park's longest studio album to date, clocking in at 47 minutes.

"The Catalyst" was sent to radio and released to digital music retailers on August 2, 2010. "The Catalyst" peaked at #40 on the Billboard Alternative Songs and Rock Songs charts. Three more singles were released to promote the album: "Waiting for the End", "Burning in the Skies" and "Iridescent". "The Catalyst" and "Waiting for the End" were certified gold by the Recording Industry Association of America (RIAA). Linkin Park promoted the album through the A Thousand Suns World Tour from October 2010 to September 2011.

The album polarized fans, but was mostly received positively by critics, some of whom found it to be a natural evolution for the band. The record debuted at number one on over ten charts, and was certified platinum by the RIAA in August 2017.

Writing and recording

Recording for the album began in 2008, less than a year after the release of Minutes to Midnight (2007). As with Minutes to Midnight, Shinoda and Rick Rubin produced the album. Primary recording sessions for A Thousand Suns took place at NRG Recording Studios in North Hollywood, Los Angeles, California. In November 2008, lead singer Chester Bennington said the new record was a concept album; he said it "sound[ed] a little daunting to me, so, I think my confidence level will drop, but when it was presented to us by this friend of ours, we liked the idea. It was an inspiring idea, and it was something we could relate a lot of the things we like to write about to."

In May 2009, Mike Shinoda revealed info on the album in a Billboard magazine story, saying: "I feel like we've been writing a lot. I'd say we've got about half the music done, though I shouldn't say halfway because who knows how long the next batch of songs will take. But all the material's just kind of coming together, and every week we meet up and assess the situation and for the rest of the week we just go and work on whatever we find exciting." He also explained the experimentation that the band would be working with, saying, "It's not going to be Hybrid Theory. It's not going to be Minutes to Midnight. And if we do it right, it'll have a cutting edge sound that defines itself as an individual record separate from anything else that's out there."

Bennington continued composing for the album while touring with Dead by Sunrise in support of their 2009 studio album Out of Ashes. He said Linkin Park was still making a concept record, stating in another interview with MTV, "we might need to just make a record and still try to do a concept but figure out a way to do it without actually waiting another five or six years to put out a record, to try to pull off all the grandiose insanity we were thinking of doing. And we're doing that." Bassist Dave "Phoenix" Farrell predicted the band's fans would be divided about A Thousand Suns, saying, "We've known [the album is] going to be different, and if fans were expecting Hybrid Theory or Meteora, they're going to be surprised. It's going to take people some time to figure it out and know what to do with it."

When asked about the new project, drummer Rob Bourdon said, "We tend to be perfectionists and it's sort of how we work. We like being in the studio and when we get in there we write a ton of material." Bourdon said the album was a challenge to complete; he said, "We've been making music for a long time so one of the challenges was to evolve and make something to keep us interested and also have a lot of fun in the process. We've been used to making a certain type of music and using sounds to accomplish that. So to break out of that and push ourselves to grow is definitely challenging." Shinoda later said the album was not a concept record, saying, "People asked us if it's a concept record, and in the middle of the process, we were contemplating whether or not that was what we wanted to do," although he said that eventually, A Thousand Suns at its completion has no narrative and is "more abstract" than many concept albums.

Style and composition

In an interview with Rolling Stone in May 2009, Shinoda said the band was in the process of writing and recording material for the album. The album was originally scheduled for an early 2010 release, but Shinoda was concerned with "the quality of the tunes" and said, "if we need to take a step back and make sure everything is top, top quality by our standards, we will". Shinoda also said that, in comparison to Minutes to Midnight, the new album would have a bigger "thread of consistency" and would be more experimental and "hopefully more cutting-edge".

Christopher Weingarten of The Village Voice compared the album to Radiohead's third studio album, OK Computer, describing the record's composition as "uninhibited hooks, daffy left turns, piano-soaked bathos, explorations of the human relationship with technology, [and] a complete avoidance of metal". Weingarten noted various elements and styles the band incorporated in A Thousand Suns, saying the band was "sink[ing] their distortion pedals into a tender oblivion, embracing the pulseless Vocoder syrup of Imogen Heap, the cuddly heavenward synths of Yeasayer, the post-apocalyptic stutter-hop of El-P, the head rush of Ibiza house". Jordy Kasko of Review Rinse Repeat compared the style of A Thousand Suns to that of Pink Floyd's eighth studio album The Dark Side of the Moon and Radiohead's fourth studio album Kid A.

James Montgomery of MTV compared the album to Kid A because of the lack of guitars, the style being completely different from the band's previous works, and the album's message. Montgomery said, "None of these problems, these terrors or these specters that haunt us in 2010 are particularly new. Quite the opposite, in fact. We've just chosen to ignore the warnings. And now it might be too late." According to turntablist Joe Hahn, the album's title is a reference to a line in the Hindu Sanskrit scripture the Bhagavad Gita "If the radiance of a thousand suns were to burst at once into the sky, that would be like the splendor of the mighty one," which was made famous by J. Robert Oppenheimer in reference to the atomic bomb. The title also appears in the album's lead single "The Catalyst", which appears in the line "God save us everyone, will we burn inside the fires of a thousand suns?". The band said Oppenheimer's comments about the nuclear bomb influenced the apocalyptic themes of the album. The band wrote about these comments in the album's liner notes: 

The band has stated that the album's tenth track, "Wretches and Kings", pays homage to the hip-hop group Public Enemy. Speaking to NME about the song's reference to Public Enemy, Shinoda said, "There is a homage to Chuck D on there. It's probably the most hip-hop song on the record and one of the most aggressive ... Public Enemy were very three-dimensional with their records because although they seemed political, there was a whole lot of other stuff going on in there too. It made me think how three-dimensional I wanted our record to be without imitating them of course, and show where we were at creatively." Ian Winwood of Kerrang! noted that "Wretches and Kings" references the Public Enemy song "Fight the Power" and compared the album's content to Public Enemy's third studio album, Fear of a Black Planet. Chuck D later provided vocals on a remix by HavocNdeeD. The fifth track "When They Come for Me" references The Blueprint2: The Gift & The Curse, the seventh studio album by hip hop artist Jay-Z, with whom the band collaborated on the 2004 EP Collision Course. The album includes samples of notable speeches by American political figures, including Martin Luther King Jr., J. Robert Oppenheimer, and Mario Savio.

Chester Bennington stated in an interview with MTV News, which referred to Linkin Park's new style as being less technical and more organic: "When it came to doing things that felt very much like older Linkin Park, like mixing hip-hop with a rock chorus, [we] felt like, if we were going to do it, we need to really do it in a way that felt natural and felt original and felt like it was something we hadn't done in the past ... [While] there are hip-hop songs on the album—'Wretches and Kings', 'When They Come for Me'—they're like nothing the band have tried before: snarling, raw, dark and ... strangely organic." 

Critics and reporters labeled A Thousand Suns as electronic rock, art rock, industrial rock, experimental rock, and progressive rock. They also noticed various traces of trip hop, ambient, alternative rock, industrial, and rap rock across the album. Compared to their previous record, Minutes to Midnight (2007), Shinoda contributed many more vocals, while Brad Delson's guitar riffs are put further into the background, which Gary Graff of Billboard described as "on the back burner (and barely even in the oven)". Shinoda raps on the tracks "When They Come for Me", "Wretches and Kings" and the album's second single "Waiting for the End". Derek Oswald of AltWire.net noted reggae-like influences on Shinoda's verses in "Waiting for the End". He sings verses on "Burning in the Skies", "Robot Boy", "Blackout", "Iridescent" and "The Catalyst". Bennington and Shinoda sing together on "The Catalyst", "Jornada del Muerto" and "Robot Boy", while "Iridescent" features all band members singing together.

Release and promotion

The album was exhibited at a 3-D laser exhibition at Music Box Theater in Hollywood on September 7, 2010. A Thousand Suns was officially released on September 10, 2010, in Germany, Austria and Switzerland; and on September 13, 2010, in the US. Linkin Park started worldwide promotion of the album with the A Thousand Suns World Tour, which started on October 7, 2010, in Buenos Aires, Argentina and ended on September 25, 2011, in Singapore. The band performed an entire setlist in the Puerta de Alcalá Gate in Madrid; their live performance of "Waiting for the End" was shown at the 2010 MTV Europe Music Awards.

Linkin Park also promoted A Thousand Suns by featuring songs from the album in video games. Joe Hahn said "The Catalyst" would be included in the video game Medal of Honor. Hahn also announced he would direct a trailer for the game; it was released on August 1, 2010— one day before the single's release. Dave "Phoenix" Farrell stated that the band's members believed the song's "dark undertones ... fits with the subject matter" of the game, which was the reason "The Catalyst" was chosen for Medal of Honor. 

During the Japanese release of the album on September 15, 2010, Warner Music Japan announced that "The Catalyst" would be the official theme song of Mobile Suit Gundam: Extreme Vs.. In addition, Warner Music Japan released a limited edition package bundle for the album, containing the CD, along with a  1/144 scale plastic model kit of the RX-78GP01Fb Gundam "Zephyranthes" Full Burnern from the anime OVA series Mobile Suit Gundam 0083: Stardust Memory, molded in colors and using color-correcting stickers evoking the imagery used on the cover of the album. It was further accompanied by artwork of the members of Linkin Park in Earth Federation military uniforms and pilot suits alongside the custom colored GP01Fb.

"Blackout" was featured in the soccer video game by EA Sports, FIFA 11. The band released a video game called Linkin Park Revenge—an edition of Tap Tap Revenge that features four tracks from the album and six songs from previous Linkin Park albums. "Wretches and Kings" is featured in the trailer for the video game EA Sports MMA.

"Blackout", "Burning in the Skies", "The Catalyst", "The Messenger", "Waiting for the End", and "Wretches and Kings" were available as downloadable content in the "Linkin Park Track Pack" for the rhythm video game Guitar Hero: Warriors of Rock, which was released on October 19, 2010, on the PlayStation Store, Xbox Live Marketplace, and Wii Shop Channel. Customers who purchased Guitar Hero: Warriors of Rock from Amazon.com between October 17 and October 23 received a copy of A Thousand Suns. Three songs were remixed and released as downloadable content for the rhythm video game DJ Hero 2 in late 2010. On January 11, 2011, a Linkin Park track pack was released for the rhythm video game Rock Band 3; it includes "Waiting for the End" and five songs from the band's previous albums.

On March 5, 2011, Mike Shinoda announced the European release of A Thousand Suns +, a limited re-issue of the album that was released on March 28, 2011. The re-release includes a live DVD of the band's MTV Europe Music Awards concert at Puerta de Alcalá, Madrid on November 7, 2010, and an MP3 audio file of the show. On June 19, 2012, a live version of the album, titled A Thousand Suns: Live Around the World was released on Spotify. It features ten of the album's fifteen songs. The tracks were recorded in London, Hamburg, Paris, Berlin, and Las Vegas.

Singles

During the announcement of the album's release date, Linkin Park said the album's first single would be "The Catalyst", which was released on August 2, 2010. From July 9, 2010, until July 25, 2010, the band held a contest titled "Linkin Park, Featuring You". In the contest, fans could download stems from "The Catalyst", remix the stems and/or write their own parts for the song on any instrument. The winner of this contest was Czeslaw "NoBraiN" Sakowski from Świdnica, Poland, whose remix is featured as an extra track on a version of the album made available from Best Buy and Napster. The album's liner notes credit Sakowski with "supplemental programming" on "When They Come for Me". The top 20 remixes that were selected by the band are being considered for future use as b-sides and online downloads.

Two of the remixes by DIGITALOMAT and ill Audio have since been released via the band's webpage as free mp3 downloads, while two by Cale Pellick and DJ Endorphin been released on an exclusive German release of "The Catalyst". The music video for "The Catalyst", directed by Joe Hahn, premiered on August 26, 2010. On August 31, 2010, it was announced that the band would give their first live performance of the single at the 2010 MTV Video Music Awards on September 12, 2010, at Griffith Observatory. The venue was kept secret until the performance, although it was revealed to be a prominent landmark in Los Angeles. The single peaked at number one on the Billboard Rock Songs and Alternative Songs charts, and on the UK Rock Chart. The single also peaked at number twenty-seven in the Billboard Hot 100 upon the release of A Thousand Suns, and spent five weeks on the chart. "The Catalyst" was certified gold by the Recording Industry Association of America (RIAA) in July 2011.

On September 2, 2010, Linkin Park released the promotional single "Wretches and Kings" to those who had pre-ordered the album. On September 8, 2010, the band debuted "Waiting for the End" and "Blackout" on their Myspace page. The band announced on its official website the "Full Experience Myspace Premiere", the streaming of the entire album on its Myspace page on September 10. A remix of "Blackout" by Renholdër was included in the soundtrack of Underworld: Awakening.

"Waiting for the End" was released as the album's second single on October 1, 2010. The music video for the song premiered on October 8, 2010, and was directed by Joe Hahn. Linkin Park's performance of "Waiting for the End" at Puerta de Alcala in Madrid was broadcast as part of the 2010 MTV Europe Music Awards. "Waiting for the End" and "When They Come for Me" were performed live on Saturday Night Live on February 5, 2011. "Waiting for the End" was featured in an episode of CSI: Crime Scene Investigation broadcast on CBS on October 14, 2010. The single peaked at number one on the Alternative Songs chart; it was Linkin Park's tenth number-one song on the chart. It peaked at number two on the Rock Songs chart and at number forty-two on the Billboard Hot 100, spending nine weeks on the chart. The single achieved success in other countries, peaking at number thirty-four in Austria, number twenty in Belgium, number 29 in Germany, and number thirty-four in Japan. "Waiting for the End" was certified gold by the RIAA in April 2011.

On January 22, 2011, Linkin Park announced that its next international single would be "Burning in the Skies". The music video, directed by Hahn, premiered on February 22 and the single was released on March 21. The single reached number thirty-five in Austria, number 35 in Portugal, number twenty-six in German airplay, and number six in Mexico.

On April 13, 2011, Shinoda confirmed that the album's third US, fourth international, and overall final single would be "Iridescent". He also said a slightly shorter version of the song would be included the soundtrack of the movie Transformers: Dark of the Moon, and that a music video directed by Hahn had been made to promote the single. Linkin Park performed the single remix of "Iridescent" at the film's premiere at Red Square, Moscow, on June 23, 2011. The single peaked at number eighty-one at the Billboard Hot 100, spending three weeks on the chart; it also peaked at number nineteen at the Alternative Songs chart and number twenty-nine at the Rock Songs chart. Despite these low peaks, the single achieved moderate success in other countries, peaking at number thirty-nine in Australia, number ten in Israel, and number two in South Korea and one in the UK Rock Chart.

Reception

Commercial
A Thousand Suns debuted at number one on the US Billboard 200 chart with first-week sales of 241,000 copies in the United States, exceeding sales of Trey Songz's Passion, Pain & Pleasure by 1,000, according to Nielsen SoundScan. It became Linkin Park's fourth US number-one album, although the first-week sales were significantly lower than those of their previous album Minutes to Midnight (2007), which opened at 623,000 copies. The album entered  Billboard'''s Rock Albums, Alternative Albums, Hard Rock Albums, and Digital Albums charts at number one. In the second week, the album slid to number three, selling 70,000 copies; in December 2010, two months after its release, its sales passed the half-million mark. On January 11, 2011, A Thousand Suns was certified gold by the RIAA for shipments of 500,000 copies sold in the US. It spent 30 weeks on the Billboard 200. By June 2014, the album had sold 906,000 copies in the US according to SoundScan.

In Canada, A Thousand Suns peaked at number one on the Canadian Albums Chart with 23,000 copies sold. In February 2011, the album was certified platinum by the Canadian Recording Industry Association for 80,000 units sold. In the United Kingdom album chart, on which it spent seventeen weeks, the album debuted at number two with first-week sales of 46,711 copies, behind The Script's album Science & Faith. On September 10, 2010, two days after the album's UK release, A Thousand Suns was certified gold by the British Phonographic Industry (BPI), marking shipments of 100,000 copies to retailers. In Australia, it debuted at number one on the ARIA Top 50 Albums, and retained the top position for four weeks. The album remained in the chart's top 50 for 18 weeks. By the end of 2010, A Thousand Suns had been certified gold by the Australian Recording Industry Association (ARIA), and the following year it was certified platinum.

Critical reception

Upon its release, A Thousand Suns was well-received by critics, although some were less enthusiastic. At Metacritic, which assigns a weighted average score out of 100 to reviews from mainstream critics, the album received an average score of 66 based on 10 reviews, indicating "generally favorable reviews".

Rick Florino of Artistdirect gave the album five stars out of five, saying, "after A Thousand Suns, all rock 'n' roll will revolve around Linkin Park"; he credited Linkin Park with creating their own genre. Ian Winwood of Kerrang! gave it an "excellent" rating, saying it "can only be best described as a political album". He praised the songwriting, saying, "These are songs that have been constructed as much as they've been written", and that its closest comparison was Public Enemy's 1990 album Fear of a Black Planet. Dave de Sylvia of Sputnikmusic called it "an extremely well-crafted rock album," saying it was somewhat better than its predecessor Minutes to Midnight (2007), but does not live up to their debut, Hybrid Theory (2000). David Buchanan of Consequence of Sound gave the album three-and-a-half out of five, saying, "Some might argue this new sound is posturing, complete mutation to the point of absurdity; in the band’s associated artwork and videos, evolution has been touted from day one. In essence, Linkin Park has been chasing this all along, and now it has become tangible, complete." Johan Wippsson from Melodic said Linkin Park "have created a very cool and unique sound" and described "Blackout" and "When They Come for Me" as "really innovative". Ian Winwood of BBC Music, in his review of the band's succeeding album Living Things, praised A Thousand Suns and described it as "a body of work startling enough that it gambled with the massive commercial success the group had achieved since their debut album, 2000's Hybrid Theory."

James Montgomery of MTV called A Thousand Suns a "sprawling, discordant, ambitious and an all-out game changer" and compared it with Radiohead's 2000 album Kid A, but said A Thousand Suns is more optimistic than Kid A. Jordy Kasko with Review Rinse Repeat gave A Thousand Suns a perfect rating, calling it an "epic quest". He compared it to Pink Floyd's The Dark Side of the Moon (1973) and Radiohead's Kid A, saying "A Thousand Suns is an ALBUM. It is not a collection of songs. It is not meant to be listened to as such. The band is going so far as to release an iTunes version that is one track, 47 minutes and 56 seconds long. This is no more an 'album' by conventional standards than Dark Side of the Moon or Kid A are. Sure, there are identifiable songs, but to understand or to appreciate any of them you must take them in the context of the entire album." 
Christopher Weingarten of The Village Voice praised the album, calling it "2010's best avant-rock nuclear-anxiety concept record", as well as comparing it to Radiohead's OK Computer (1997).

Mikael Wood of Spin gave the album six stars out of ten, saying it "contains plenty of aggressively arty material" and calling "The Messenger" the "most unexpected track on the boldly conceived A Thousand Suns". Leah Greenblatt of Entertainment Weekly gave the album a B rating and said "at times the band's odd mélange of industrial grind, hip-hop swagger, and teenage-wasteland angst feels jarring". Jody Rosen of Rolling Stone gave it three stars out of five; he said Linkin Park were "feeling their way toward a new identity"; he called their skill for melody "obvious" and said they sounded like "a killer Linkin Park tribute band". Australia's Music Network magazine gave the album a mixed review, calling it "a radical shift for the band, but it’s also a very uneven one ... while there's some commanding moments ('The Catalyst,' 'Wretches and Kings'), many of the tracks feel like experiments rather than formed songs".

Johnny Firecloud of Antiquiet condemned the album, called it a "melodramatic farce", and said it was a "mechanized mess of sentimentality ... the 15 track collection is entirely unconvincing as a call to action for uprising and activism". Stephen Thomas Erlewine of AllMusic said the album was a "clear continuation" of its predecessor but said "the problem is, the subdued rhythms, riffs and raps of A Thousand Suns wind up monochromatic". Jim Farber of The New York Daily News gave the album one star out of five, saying, "no fewer than 15 cuts crowd the tight 47-minute length of the CD, many of them fragments or, more accurately, sonic non sequiturs". Jamie Primack of The Badger Herald wrote, "there are at least five filler tracks that contain nothing more than noise and sound bites ... the full-length songs aren’t particularly daring or interesting".

Fans of the band were polarized by A Thousand Suns. Initial signs of the fans' division over the band's new material occurred when "The Catalyst" was released as a single. MTV conducted a poll asking fans how they received the song; most responses were positive but a large amount were dissatisfied with it. Fans then therefore debated on what they thought of the new sound. Sara Ferrer of Orange County Reloaded said the album split the views of fans and critics into "love-it versus hate-it groups". Montgomery expressed similar sentiments, saying the album "alternately thrilled and thinned [Linkin Park's] substantial fanbase with its vast swaths of sonic sprawl (and overall lack of guitar solos)." Mike Shinoda shared his thoughts on the divided reception of the fans; he thanked the people who accepted the album and defended it from the criticism of those who disliked it. Commenting on fans' polarized response to the album, Chester Bennington said, "[A Thousand Suns] is definitely something that we knew people would need to digest and get over the fact that it's not what they thought we would do."

AccoladesKerrang! listed A Thousand Suns as the nineteenth-best album of 2010 on their list of the top 20 albums that year. James Montgomery of MTV listed the album as twentieth best album of 2010, calling it "the year's most ambitious major-label rock album... there's no denying the dense, dark power it packs".

The album received numerous awards and nominations. At the 2011 MTV Video Music Aid Japan, A Thousand Suns was nominated for Album of the Year, while "The Catalyst" was nominated for Best Group Video and Best Rock Video. The album received two 2011 Billboard Music Award nominations; Best Rock Album and Top Alternative Album. "Waiting for the End" was nominated for Top Alternative Song. The music video for "Waiting for the End" was nominated at the 2011 MTV Video Music Awards for Best Special Effects. Linkin Park won the Best International Rock/Alternative Group for A Thousand Suns at the 2011 ECHO Awards. At the MTV Video Game Awards, "Blackout" won the Best Song in a Video Game award for its use in FIFA 11. "Waiting for the End" was nominated at the 2011 Teen Choice Awards for Choice Rock Song.

Track listing

Personnel
Source: AllMusic and A Thousand Suns ''booklet.

Linkin Park
 Chester Bennington – vocals, percussion, rhythm guitar on "Iridescent"
 Mike Shinoda - vocals, lead guitar on "Burning in the Skies", rhythm guitar on "Waiting for the End"; keyboards, sampler, piano, synthesizer; vocoder on "The Requiem" and "Fallout", producer, engineer, creative director, Pro Tools
 Brad Delson – lead guitar, rhythm guitar on "Burning in the Skies"; backing vocals, keyboards, percussion, acoustic guitar on "The Messenger", Pro Tools
 Dave "Phoenix" Farrell – bass, backing vocals, keyboards on "Blackout"
 Joe Hahn – turntables, samples, programming, backing vocals, creative director
 Rob Bourdon - drums, percussion, backing vocals

Samples
 Martin Luther King Jr. – speech/speaker/speaking part ("Beyond Vietnam: A Time to Break Silence" speech) – "Wisdom, Justice, and Love"
 J. Robert Oppenheimer – interviewee – "The Radiance"
 Mario Savio – speech/speaker/speaking part ("Operation of the Machines" speech) – "Wretches and Kings"

Production
 Rick Rubin – producer
 Neal Avron – mixing
 Kymm Britton – publicity
 Anton Brooks – publicity
 Lindsay Chase – production coordination
 Ryan DeMarti – production coordination, A&R
 Nicolas Fournier – assistant
 Jerry Johnson – drum technician
 Liza Joseph – A&R
 Frank Maddocks – art direction, design, creative director
 Ethan Mates – engineer, Pro Tools
 Vlado Meller – mastering
 Josh Newell – engineer, Pro Tools
 Czeslaw "NoBraiN" Sakowski – programming
 Mark Santangelo – assistant
 Peter Standish – marketing
 Josh Vanover – artwork, creative director
 Ellen Wakayama – creative director
 Tom Whalley – A&R

Charts

Weekly charts

Year-end charts

Decade-end charts

Certifications

Release history

References

2010 albums
Albums produced by Mike Shinoda
Albums produced by Rick Rubin
Art rock albums by American artists
Experimental rock albums by American artists
Industrial rock albums
Progressive rock albums by American artists
Concept albums
Linkin Park albums
Warner Records albums